Sycamore Township may refer to:

 Sycamore Township, Hamilton County, Ohio
 Sycamore Township, Wyandot County, Ohio

Ohio township disambiguation pages